Black & White is the first full-length studio album released by the Christian pop/rock band Royal Tailor. The album was released on June 7, 2011 by Essential Records and distributed via Provident Label Group. This album received a nomination at the 54th Grammy Awards for Best Contemporary Christian Music Album.

Track listing

Charts

References

2011 albums
Essential Records (Christian) albums